For information on all George Mason University sports, see George Mason Patriots

The George Mason Patriots men's soccer team is a varsity intercollegiate athletic team of George Mason University in Fairfax, Virginia, United States. The team is a member of the Atlantic 10 Conference, which is part of the National Collegiate Athletic Association's Division I. George Mason's first men's soccer team was fielded in 1968. The team plays its home games at George Mason Stadium in Fairfax, Virginia.

Irad Young played for the team and earned All-Conference Honors in 1990 and 1992, All-Virginia, and All-South Atlantic Region, and was inducted into the GMU Soccer Hall of Fame in 2012. He broke the school's career assist record (20), and became  the first GMU player to notch 20 goals and 20 assists.

Year-by-year results

NCAA tournament results 

George Mason has appeared in 11 NCAA tournaments.

References

External links 
 

 
Soccer clubs in Virginia
1968 establishments in Virginia
Association football clubs established in 1968